The Market Women's Revolt of 1977 was a series of large demonstrations and riots across Guinea brought about by the imposition of government-set prices for goods sold in the country's public markets.

The riots began on 27 August 1977 when women vendors in Conakry's Madina Market began rioting against the "economic police," who were responsible for enforcing the government's price controls and were often corrupt. The riots spread throughout the country and led to several deaths.

The revolt is seen as a major turning point in the history of Guinea and the end of President Ahmed Sékou Touré's most radical economic reforms. 27 August became a public holiday following the end of President Ahmed Sékou Touré's regime although it was suspended by Lansana Conté's government in 2006, shortly before an uprising sparked by the price of rice took place.

References

Protests in Guinea
August 1977 events in Africa
Conflicts in 1977
1970s in Guinea